Dinkha (Syriac alphabet , Classical Syriac ) also spelled Denkha, is an Aramaic language name. It may refer to:
Michael Denkha, Iranian-Australian actor
Dinkha IV, Patriarch of the Assyrian Church of the East
Shimun XIII Dinkha, Patriarch of the Chaldean Catholic Church
Shimun IX Dinkha, Patriarch of the Chaldean Catholic Church